Sophie Lefranc-Duvillard (5 February 1971 – 22 April 2017) was a French alpine skier who competed in the 1992 Winter Olympics, 1994 Winter Olympics, and 1998 Winter Olympics.

External links
 sports-reference.com

References 

1971 births
2017 deaths
French female alpine skiers
Olympic alpine skiers of France
Alpine skiers at the 1992 Winter Olympics
Alpine skiers at the 1994 Winter Olympics
Alpine skiers at the 1998 Winter Olympics